John Southern may refer to:
 John Southern (cricketer, born 1952), English cricketer for Hampshire
 John Dunlop Southern (1899–1972), Royal Navy officer and cricketer for Derbyshire
 John Southern (engineer) (c.1758–1815), English engineer